Sinope  is a retrograde irregular satellite of Jupiter discovered by Seth Barnes Nicholson at Lick Observatory in 1914, and is named after Sinope of Greek mythology.

It was sometimes called "Hades" between 1955 and 1975.

Orbit

Sinope orbits Jupiter on a high-eccentricity and high-inclination retrograde orbit. Its orbit is continuously changing due to solar and planetary perturbations. Sinope is believed to belong to the Pasiphae group of retrograde irregular moons. However, given its mean inclination and different colour, Sinope could be also an independent object, captured independently, unrelated to the collision and break-up at the origin of the group. The diagram illustrates Sinope's orbital elements in relation to other satellites of the group.

Sinope is also known to be in a secular resonance with Jupiter, similar to Pasiphae. However, Sinope can drop out of this resonance and has periods of both resonant and non-resonant behaviour in time scales of 107 years.

Physical characteristics

Sinope is red (colour indices B−V=0.84, R−V=0.46), unlike Pasiphae, which is grey.

Sinope's infrared spectrum is similar to those of D-type asteroids but different from that of Pasiphae. These dissimilarities of the physical parameters suggest a different origin from the core members of the group.

See also 
 Sinope in fiction

References

External links
Sinope Profile by NASA's Solar System Exploration
David Jewitt pages
 Jupiter's Known Satellites (by Scott S. Sheppard)
 Ephemeris IAU-MPC NSES

Moons of Jupiter
Irregular satellites
19140721
Pasiphae group
Moons with a retrograde orbit